Schwartziella is a genus of minute sea snails, marine gastropod mollusks or micromollusks in the family Zebinidae.

The generic name Schwartziella is in honor of Gustav Franziskus Maria Schwartz von Mohrenstern.

Distribution
Schwartziella species have been found in the Atlantic Ocean, including the Caribbean, the Gulf of Mexico and Cape Verde, in the Indian Ocean, around Australia and New Zealand and in the Pacific Ocean.

Species
Species within the genus Schwartziella include:

Schwartziella abacocubensis Espinosa & Ortea, 2002
Schwartziella abundata Rolán & Luque, 2000
Schwartziella africana (Dautzenberg, 1912)
Schwartziella angularis Rolán & Luque, 2000
Schwartziella bakeri (Bartsch, 1902)
 † Schwartziella bicrepida (Weisbord, 1962)
Schwartziella bouryi (Desjardin, 1949) (taxon inquirendum, Original name is a primary homonym of Rissoina clavula bouryi Cossmann, 1888)
Schwartziella bryerea (Montagu, 1803)
Schwartziella burragei (Bartsch, 1915)
Schwartziella californica (Bartsch, 1915)
Schwartziella cancapae Rolán & Luque, 2000
Schwartziella catesbyana (d’Orbigny, 1842)
Schwartziella chesnelii (Michaud, 1830)
Schwartziella clandestina (C. B. Adams, 1852)
Schwartziella cleo (Bartsch, 1915)
Schwartziella congenita (E. A. Smith, 1890)
Schwartziella corrugata Rolán & Luque, 2000
Schwartziella crassior (Dautzenberg, 1912)
 Schwartziella curtispira Paulmier, 2017
Schwartziella dalli (Bartsch, 1915)
Schwartziella depressa Rolán & Luque, 2000
 Schwartziella desjardini (Faber, 2017)
Schwartziella dubiosa (C. B. Adams, 1850)
Schwartziella effusa (Mörch, 1860)
Schwartziella ephamilla (Watson, 1886)
Schwartziella excelsis (Laseron, 1956)
Schwartziella firmata (C. B. Adams, 1852)
Schwartziella fischeri (Desjardin, 1949)
Schwartziella fiscina (Cotton, 1952)
Schwartziella floridana (Olsson & Harbison, 1953)
Schwartziella fulgida Rolán & Luque, 2000
Schwartziella gibbera Rolán & Luque, 2000
Schwartziella gradata Rolán & Luque, 2000
Schwartziella grata (Cotton, 1952)
 Schwartziella guadeloupensis Paulmier, 2017
 Schwartziella guyanensis Faber, 2018
Schwartziella hannai (Smith & Gordon, 1948)
 † Schwartziella harpa (Gardner, 1948) 
Schwartziella helenae (E. A. Smith, 1890)
Schwartziella hoenselaari Rolán & Luque, 2000
Schwartziella inconspicua (Brazier, 1877)
Schwartziella inscripta Rolán & Luque, 2000
Schwartziella irregularis Rolán & Luque, 2000
Schwartziella laseroni (Chang & Wu, 2004) 
Schwartziella lata Laseron, 1956
Schwartziella leucophanes (Tomlin, 1931)
Schwartziella luisalvarezi Rolán & Fernández-Garcés, 2010 
Schwartziella luisi Rolán & Luque, 2000
Schwartziella lutaoi (Chang & Wu, 2004)
 † Schwartziella maiquetiana (Weisbord, 1962)
Schwartziella mellissi (E. A. Smith, 1890)
Schwartziella minima Rolán & Luque, 2000
Schwartziella minor (C. B. Adams, 1850)
Schwartziella minuta (Nevill, 1874)
Schwartziella mizunamiensis (Itoigawa & Nishimoto, 1984)
Schwartziella moerchiella (Chang & Wu, 2004)
Schwartziella nereina (Bartsch, 1915)
Schwartziella newcombei (Dall, 1897)
Schwartziella obesa Rolán & Luque, 2000
Schwartziella orientalis (G. Nevill, 1881)
Schwartziella paradoxa Rolán & Luque, 2000
Schwartziella paucicostata Rolán & Luque, 2000
Schwartziella pavita Rolán & Luque, 2000
Schwartziella peregrina Gofas, 2007
Schwartziella puncticulata Rolán & Luque, 2000
Schwartziella rarilineata Rolán & Luque, 2000
Schwartziella rectilinea Rolán & Luque, 2000
Schwartziella robusta Rolán & Luque, 2000
Schwartziella sanmartini Rolán & Luque, 2000
Schwartziella scalarella (C. B. Adams, 1845)
Schwartziella scalarioides (Philippi, 1848) 
 Schwartziella scissurata Paulmier, 2017
Schwartziella sculpturata Rolán & Luque, 2000
Schwartziella similiter Rolán & Luque, 2000
Schwartziella sulcostriata Rolán & Luque, 2000
Schwartziella triticea (Pease, 1861)
 Schwartziella turtoni (E. A. Smith, 1890)
Schwartziella typica Rolán & Luque, 2000
Schwartziella vanpeli (De Jong & Coomans, 1988)
† Schwartziella venezuelana (Weisbord, 1962) 
Schwartziella willetti (Strong, 1938)
Schwartziella woodwardii (Carpenter, 1857)
Schwartziella yoguii Rolán & Fernández-Garcés, 2010  
Schwartziella yragoae Rolán & Hernández, 2003
 Schwartziella zeltnerioides (Yokoyama, 1920)

Species brought into synonymy
Schwartziella bilabiata (Boettger, 1893): synonym of Ailinzebina bilabiata (Boettger, 1893)
Schwartziella coronadoensis (Bartsch, 1915): synonym of Rissoina coronadensis Bartsch, 1915
Schwartziella darwinensis (Laseron, 1956): synonym of Pandalosia darwinensis Laseron, 1956:synonym of Pandalosia subfirmata (O. Boettger, 1887) (Pandalosia accepted as full genus)
Schwartziella delicatula (Laseron, 1956): synonym of Pandalosia delicatula Laseron, 1956
 Schwartziella ephamilla (R. B. Watson, 1886) accepted as Pandalosia ephamilla (R. B. Watson, 1886)
 Schwartziella excelsis (Laseron, 1956) accepted as Pandalosia excelsis Laseron, 1956 accepted as Pandalosia subfirmata (O. Boettger, 1887)
Schwartziella laevissima (C. B. Adams, 1850): synonym of Zebina browniana (d'Orbigny, 1842) (does not belong to Schwartziella)
 Schwartziella lutaoi (C.-K. Chang & W.-L. Wu, 2004) accepted as Pandalosia lutaoi C.-K. Chang & W.-L. Wu, 2004
 Schwartziella minuta (G. Nevill & H. Nevill, 1874) accepted as Pandalosia minuta (G. Nevill & H. Nevill, 1874) (Pandalosia accepted as genus)
 Schwartziella mizunamiensis (Itoigawa & Nishimoto, 1984) accepted as Pandalosia mizunamiensis Itoigawa & Nishimoto, 1984 accepted as Pandalosia ephamilla (R. B. Watson, 1886) (Pandalosia accepted as full genus)
 Schwartziella moerchiella (C.-K. Chang & W.-L. Wu, 2004) accepted as Pandalosia moerchiella C.-K. Chang & W.-L. Wu, 2004 (Does not belong to Schwartziella; identification uncertain; recorded as basionym)
Schwartziella nicaobesa Rolán & Fernández-Garcés, 2010: synonym of Rissoina nicaobesa Rolán & Fernández-Garcés, 2010
Schwartziella obtusa (Laseron, 1956): synonym of Pandalosia subfirmata (O. Boettger, 1887)
Schwartziella rietensis (Turton, 1932): synonym of Rissoina rietensis Turton, 1932
 Schwartziella scalariformis (R. B. Watson, 1886) accepted as Schwartziella ephamilla (R. B. Watson, 1886) accepted as Pandalosia ephamilla (R. B. Watson, 1886) (primary junior homonym, replaced by the author)
Schwartziella scalariformis (Watson, 1886): synonym of Schwartziella firmata (C. B. Adams, 1852) 
Schwartziella scalaroides (C. B. Adams, 1850): synonym of Schwartziella chesnelii (Michaud, 1830)
Schwartziella subangulata (C. B. Adams, 1850): synonym of Schwartziella bryerea (Montagu, 1803)
 Schwartziella subfirmata (Boettger, 1887): synonym of Pandalosia subfirmata (O. Boettger, 1887)
Schwartziella subulata(Laseron, 1956): synonym of Pandalosia subulata Laseron, 1956

References

 Kosuge, S., 1965a. Descriptions of new genera and species of the family Rissoidae. Venus 24: 108-112
 Rolán E., 2005. Malacological Fauna From The Cape Verde Archipelago. Part 1, Polyplacophora and Gastropoda

External links
 Nevill, G. (1881). New or little-known Mollusca of the Indo-Malayan fauna. The Journal of the Asiatic Society of Bengal. Part II, 50 (3): 125-167, pl. 5-7. Calcutta
 Taki, I. & Oyama, K. (1954) Matajiro Yokoyama's, The Pliocene and later faunas from the Kwanto region in Japan. Palaeontological Society of Japan Special Papers, 2, 1–68, 49 pls.

 
Gastropod genera